The Letter of Majesty (1609) was a 17th-century European document, reluctantly signed by the Holy Roman Emperor, Rudolf II, granting religious tolerance to both Protestant and Catholic citizens living in the estates of Bohemia. The letter also created a Bohemian Protestant State Church, run by said estates. A similar Letter was issued for Silesia.

In 1611, Rudolf inexplicably permitted his cousin Leopold to invade Bohemia with some 7,000 troops. A considerable Bohemian force drove Leopold back from the suburbs of Prague, and the Bohemian Estates called upon Matthias to take over the government of their kingdom.

Notes

References 
Wedgwood, C.V. (2005). The Thirty Years War. New York Review of Books.
Parker, G. (edited)(1997). The Thirty Years War. Routledge.
"The Bohemian Religious Peace (July 1609)". German History in Documents and Images. Accessed 11 July 2019. http://ghdi.ghi-dc.org/sub_document.cfm?document_id=4501

1609 works
Rudolf II, Holy Roman Emperor
17th-century documents
Edicts of toleration